The Ben Hogan Award is an annual prize given by Friends of Golf and the Golf Coaches Association of America, since 1990, to the best college golf player in the United States.

The Colonial Country Club in Fort Worth, Texas joined the organization in 2001. Since 2005, the award winner is named at a ceremony prior to the Crowne Plaza Invitational at Colonial and is invited to the following year's tournament.

Winners

See also
Haskins Award

External links 
 Official website

College golf in the United States
College sports trophies and awards in the United States
Golf awards in the United States
Golf in Texas
Awards established in 1990